Newry and Armagh can refer to:

Newry and Armagh (Assembly constituency)
Newry and Armagh (UK Parliament constituency)